WGAP (1400 AM, "Random Music Radio") is a radio station broadcasting a variety hits music format. Licensed to Maryville, Tennessee, United States, the station serves the Knoxville area.

The station is currently owned by Loud Media LLC, and features programming from Dial Global and Motor Racing Network.

On April 15, 2022, it was announced that Blount Broadcasting Corporation has come to an agreement to sell WGAP, its sister station WKVL, and two translators to Loud Media. The sale was consummated on August 17, 2022.

On August 22, 2022, WGAP changed their format from classic country to variety hits, branded as "Random Music Radio", simulcasting WKVL 850 AM.

Previous logo

References

External links

GAP
Maryville, Tennessee